Hurdy Gurdy is a 1929 animated short film which is presented by Carl Laemmle and was produced by Walter Lantz, who he and his wife would go on to make Woody Woodpecker. The film, which is animated by R.C. Hamilton, Bill Nolan and Tom Palmer, features Oswald the Lucky Rabbit, who is substituted for the organ grinder's dancer, after the original one is comically swallowed up by Oswald's bubblegum.

The title is another name for the instrument (that instrument being a barrel organ) which the street performer plays throughout the film, as the informal meaning of the term 'Hurdy Gurdy' is a "barrel organ".

The film is recorded on Western Electric apparatus, which was an early sound-on-film recording system. This same system was also used on another Oswald short film entitled Permanent Wave, which was released in the same year.

Copyrighted on January 3, 1930, but released the year prior, the film was released by Universal Pictures. Thus, the film is part of the Universal series of Oswald The Lucky Rabbit films.

Plot

The film opens with a bear (who is the street performer) using a barrel organ (with a mouse and a piano inside of the box), and a monkey dancing to the music made by it. It was interrupted later by the inside as the mouse falls asleep. The bear woke the mouse up by yelling in his ear. And the mouse shocked himself as he started playing it professionally. The music and the dancing continues until Oswald throws his bubblegum onto the floor and the monkey steps on it. In an attempt to free himself, the monkey comically gets himself swallowed up by the gum. The street performer, who is angered by the events, grabs Oswald and drags him by the neck with a leach through whilst playing the barrel organ. He does this until he descends onto a street with a girl who is seen using her clothes and her washing line comically like a swing. The girl think positively about the music, who attempts to give money to them. The street performer notices this and asks Oswald to get the money, by comically using a mouse trap in order to get up to her house. However, when Oswald gets into the house, he and the girl passionately kiss. The street performer, then tries to pull Oswald back with the leach. So Oswald free himself by comically takes off his head and removing the leach. He places the leach onto one of the legs of a hippo's bathtub. Oswald then blows a raspberry in order to gather the street performer's attention. This angers the street performer, who pulls at the leach in order to retrieve Oswald. This comically sends the hippo's bathtub crashing through the window, and hitting the street performer on the ground. This makes the hippo scream, and comically run away with her legs in the bathtub. After that, The street performer sees both Oswald and the girl, and comically scales up a pipe in order to reach them. However, once the street performer is on top of the roof and tries to grab Oswald and the girl, Oswald and the girl both use a piece of clothing as a parachute, which catches the street perform off-guard, and also makes the street performer fall off the building and slam into the ground. After falling, the street performer realises that Oswald and the girl are stealing his barrel organ. So, in response, the street performer throws a brick at them both. The brick hits Oswald, who falls off the organ. The street performer then throws another brick. Oswald, then comically uses the organ to bat it away, like a baseball bat. He does this until one of the bricks hits the street performer on the head. This makes the street performer hallucinate, with the buildings comically dancing in his hallucination. The street performer hallucinates until he collapses. Oswald and the girl both laugh at the events, and the film ends with them both kissing.

Characters
The film has three main characters, one of them is Oswald. Oswald is substituted as the dancer for the street performer, after the original one is comically swallowed up by bubblegum. Another character is the street performer, he plays the barrel organ throughout the film, and also fights with Oswald near the end of the film. That fight results in a brick being thrown at the street performer's head, which makes him hallucinate and collapse at the end of the film. The other main character is the girl. She falls in love with Oswald and runs away with him at the end of the film.

Reception
Hurdy Gurdy was reviewed by the cinema magazines at that time. The Motion Picture News said that the film includes Good Sound Cartoonantics, and also said that the film developed "some good cartoon stunts".

References

External links 

1929 films
1929 short films
1920s animated short films
1920s American animated films
1929 animated films
American black-and-white films
Oswald the Lucky Rabbit cartoons